Patricia Hooker (17 February 1933 – 2001) was an Australian writer who worked extensively in England. She wrote for TV, radio and the stage.

She wrote The Golden Road, the first play on British television that was both written by a woman and about a lesbian relationship.

Biography
She grew up in the town of Port Lincoln in South Australia and trained as a stenographer. She began writing in her spare time and her work began appearing in amateur theatres. She worked as a secretary at the Stevedoring Commission in Sydney and also as a court reporter.

Hooker was working as a shorthand typist in a city office in 1959 when she wrote the story for The Little Woman at home in the evenings. She wrote it as a stage play and it was included in a night of one-act plays at the Genesian Theatre. To help it reach a wider audience, Patricia studied a book on TV technique and decided to revise the script as a TV play. The ABC produced it in 1961 by which time she was at the ABC as a script assistant.

She moved to London in 1964 and worked as a court reporter as well as writing for TV and radio.

Select credits
A Bird in a Gilded Cage (1957) – TV play
The Little Woman (1961) – TV play
Twilight of a Hero (1962) – radio play about King David's love for Absalom
Poet's Corner (1962) - radio writer
Concord of Sweet Sounds (1963) – TV play and adapted for radio
George (1964) - lunch hour play from short story by Anthony West
A Season in Hell (1964) – TV play – later adapted for radio
Man of Blood (1964) - play
The Winged Chariot (1967) - radio play about Socrates
The Lotus Eaters (1968) – play
Counterstrike (1969) – TV series
A Fit and Proper Person (1970) - TV play
Kate (1971–73) - TV series
Last Seen Wearing (1972) - radio play
Harriets Back in Town (1972–73) - TV series
Harriet's Back in Town (1973) – TV series
Armchair Theatre - "The Golden Road" (1973) - TV play
Crown Court (1973) - TV series
The Beauty of the World (1973) - radio play
Simon Fenton's Story (1973) - TV play
"Going to St Ives" (1973) - TV play
Six Days of Justice (1973–75) – TV series
The Carnforth Practice (1974) – TV series
Rooms (1975) – TV series
Angels (1976) – TV series - episode "Off Duty"
The Gentle Touch (1980) – "Chance", "Rogue" 
Plays for Pleasure – "The Concubine" (1981) – Tv episode
Survival (1989) - radio play
Right Ho Jeeves (1989) - radio play
Seven Against Reeves (1989) - radio play

References

External links

Patricia Hooker at AustLit
production of Pat Hooker's plays at AusStage
Biographical information

Australian women dramatists and playwrights
1933 births
2001 deaths
20th-century Australian dramatists and playwrights
Writers from South Australia
People from Port Lincoln
20th-century Australian women writers